"" is the national anthem of Haiti. It was written by Justin Lhérisson and composed by Nicolas Geffrard.

Etymology
"La Dessalinienne" is named in honor of Haiti's revolutionary leader and first ruler Jean-Jacques Dessalines. The title was suggested by historian Clément Lanier.

History
To commemorate the 100th anniversary of the Haitian Revolution, a competition was held for a national anthem in 1903. The poetic words of Justin Lhérisson and martial composition of Nicolas Geffrard won over the judges, who preferred it to "L'Artibonitienne" by Capois diplomat Louis Edouard Pouget.

The anthem was premiered at an October 1903 celebration of the Armée Indigène's entry into Port-au-Prince organised by the Association du Petit Théâtre. It was sung by Auguste de Pradines, also known as Kandjo. The text and music were printed at Bernard's in Port-au-Prince and distributed throughout the country during the week. It was officially adopted as the national anthem in 1904.

Lyrics
As a one-verse rendition can be relatively short, a common way to lengthen a performance is to perform an abridged arrangement consisting of the first verse immediately followed by the last.

French lyrics

Haitian Creole lyrics
A Haitian Creole version was created by Raymond A. Moise, and Haitian singer Ansy Dérose (1934–1998) helped popularize it in 1980. Although it became widely accepted, it is not official.

See also

Quand nos Aïeux brisèrent leurs entraves
Flag of Haiti
Haïti Chérie
Music of Haiti

Notes

References

External links 
"La Dessalinienne" (mp3)

North American anthems
National symbols of Haiti
1904 compositions
Haitian songs
French-language songs
National anthems
National anthem compositions in D-flat major